Communauté d'agglomération de l'Auxerrois is the communauté d'agglomération, an intercommunal structure, centred on the town of Auxerre. It is located in the Yonne department, in the Bourgogne-Franche-Comté region, central France. Created in 2017, its seat is in Auxerre. Its area is 434.0 km2. Its population was 67,651 in 2019, of which 34,451 in Auxerre proper.

Composition
The communauté d'agglomération consists of the following 29 communes:

Appoigny
Augy
Auxerre
Bleigny-le-Carreau
Branches
Champs-sur-Yonne
Charbuy
Chevannes
Chitry
Coulanges-la-Vineuse
Escamps
Escolives-Sainte-Camille
Gurgy
Gy-l'Évêque
Irancy
Jussy
Lindry
Monéteau
Montigny-la-Resle
Perrigny
Quenne
Saint-Bris-le-Vineux
Saint-Georges-sur-Baulche
Vallan
Venoy
Villefargeau
Villeneuve-Saint-Salves
Vincelles
Vincelottes

References

Auxerre
Auxerre